= Karhod Khurd =

- village
- Location within Madhya Pradesh Location within India
- Coordinates: 23.4291968°N 77.4874049°E
- Country: India
- State: Madhya Pradesh
- District: Bhopal
- Tehsil: Huzur
- Elevation: 459 m (1,506 ft)

Population (2011)
  - Total: 980
- Time zone: UTC+5:30 (IST)
- ISO 3166 code: MP-IN
- 2011 census code: 482402

Karhod Khurd is a village in the Bhopal district of Madhya Pradesh, India. It is located in the Huzur tehsil and the Phanda block.

== Demographics ==
According to the 2011 census of India, Karhod Khurd has 223 households. The effective literacy rate (i.e. the literacy rate of population excluding children aged 6 and below) is 67.31%.

Demographics (2011 Census)
	Total	Male	Female
Population	980	515	465
Children aged below 6 years	154	76	78
Scheduled caste	52	29	23
Scheduled tribe	317	166	151
Literates	556	320	236
Workers (all)	379	239	140
Main workers (total)	290	222	68
Main workers: Cultivators	66	52	14
Main workers: Agricultural labourers	203	155	48
Main workers: Household industry workers	2	1	1
Main workers: Other	19	14	5
Marginal workers (total)	89	17	72
Marginal workers: Cultivators	1	1	0
Marginal workers: Agricultural labourers	82	14	68
Marginal workers: Household industry workers	2	0	2
Marginal workers: Others	4	2	2
Non-workers	601	276	325
